Valga is a municipality of Spain in the province of Pontevedra, in the autonomous community of Galicia.

References

Municipalities in the Province of Pontevedra